is a freelance announcer in Japan. She is a former announcer for TV Asahi.

Background
Yoshie Takeuchi was born in Tokyo Prefecture. Due to her father's job, she lived abroad between the ages of 10 and 15. After returning to Japan, she graduated from Tokyo Gakugei High School and enrolled in the political science department of Keio University School of Law.

In 2006, she was the winner of a Miss Keio contest, a highly publicized annual event at the university.

Career
After graduating from Keio University, Takeuchi joined TV Asahi in April 2008, co-hosting Music Station with Tamori from October 2008.

She is one of the five announcers on the cross-media "EZ News EX" service provided to mobile phones by TV Asahi, Asahi Shimbun, and KDDI.

Programs
 Music Station
 Super J Channel
 Hodo Station (Sunday)
 Yabecchi FC
 Get Sports
 Okazu no Cooking
 Rakugomono
 ANN News
 News Access (BS Asahi)

References

External links
 Official profile 

Japanese television personalities
Living people
1986 births
People from Tokyo
Keio University alumni
TV Asahi